Alan-e Sofla (also Romanized as  Ālān-e Soflá, ‘Alān-e Soflá, and Allān-e Soflá; also known as Alānd Pāin and Ālān-e Pā’īn) is a village in Gol Tappeh Rural District, Gol Tappeh District, Kabudarahang County, Hamadan Province, Iran. At the 2006 census, its population was 497, in 103 families.

References

Populated places in Kabudarahang County